This is a list of American Indian music by group or tribal nation. See: American Indian music.

Aleut music: people
Algonquin music: people
Menominee music: people
Odawa music: people
Ojibwe music: people
Potawatomi music: people
Apache music: people
Arapaho music: people
Assiniboine music: people
Blackfoot music: people
Cahto music: people
Cahuilla music: people
Cherokee music: people
Cheyenne music: people
Chickasaw music: people
Chinookan music: people
Choctaw music: people
Chumash music: people
Comanche music: people
Cree music: people
Creek music: people
Crow music: people
Dene music: people
Haida music: people
Innu music: people
Eskimo/Inuit-Yupik/Iñupiat/Yupik/Inuit music: Eskimo/Inuit-Yupik/Inuit/Iñupiat/Yupik
Yup'ik dance
Iroquois music: people
Cayuga music: people
Mohawk music: people
Oneida music: people
Onondaga music: people
Seneca music: people
Tuscarora music: people
Kiowa music: people
Klamath music: people
Kootenai music: people
Kwakwaka'wakw music: people
Miami music: people
Métis music: people
Navajo music: people
Nez Perce music: people
Nuxalk music: people
Omaha music: people
Osage music: people
Ottawa music: people
Paiute music: people
Pawnee music: people
Pomo music: people
Potawatomi music: people
Pueblo music: people
Hopi music: people
Taos Pueblo music: Taos Pueblo
Zuni music: people
Seminole music: people
Shawnee music: people
Shoshone music: people
Sioux music: people
Dakota music: people
Nakota music: people
Tlingit music: people
Tohono O'odham music: people
Ute music: people
Yaqui music: people
Yuman music: people

Music-related lists
 
Native American-related lists